Kate Walbert (born August 13, 1961) is an American novelist and short story writer who lives in New York City. Her novel, Our Kind, was a finalist for the National Book Award in fiction. Her novel A Short History of Women, a New York Times bestseller, was a finalist for the Los Angeles Times Book Prize and named one of the ten best books of 2009 by The New York Times.

Life 
Walbert was born in New York City but raised in Georgia, Texas, Japan, and Pennsylvania. After graduating from Choate Rosemary Hall, she attended Northwestern University’s School of Communication before earning a master's degree in English from NYU. Among other publications, her short fiction has appeared in The New Yorker, and The Paris Review, and has twice been included in The Best American Short Stories and the O. Henry Awards. She has published one short story collection and four novels. Her first novel, The Gardens of Kyoto, received the Connecticut Book Award in fiction and was a finalist for the IMPAC/Dublin award.

Awards 
Walbert was a recipient of a National Endowment for the Arts Fellowship and a Connecticut Commission on the Arts Fellowship. From 2011-2012, she was a Fellow at the Dorothy and Lewis B. Cullman Center for Writers and Scholars at the New York Public Library.

Partial bibliography

Novels 
 To Do (2019)
 His Favorites (2018)
 The Sunken Cathedral (2015)
 A Short History of Women (2009)
 Our Kind (2004)
 The Gardens of Kyoto (2001)

Short fiction 
 Where She Went (1998)

Reviews 
Reviewing A Short History of Women, The Washington Post called Walbert “reminiscent of a host of innovative writers from Virginia Woolf to Muriel Spark to Pat Barker.”

References

External links 
 Kate Walbert's website
 Los Angeles Times Book Prize Finalists 2010
 Sunday Book Review "A Short History of Women" by Leah Hager Cohen
 Washington Post Book Review: A Short History of Women
 "Our Kind" on nationalbook.org
 "Kate Walbert on A Short History of Women" by Eryn Loeb for Time Out New York
 Kate Walbert Interview  on NPR
 Kate Walbert Interview from bitchmagazine.org
 Kate Walbert Interview from bookbrowse.com

20th-century American novelists
21st-century American novelists
American women novelists
Living people
20th-century American women writers
21st-century American women writers
1961 births